All Request Live is the fourth live album by the American rock band Ween, and the third to be released on their home record label Chocodog Records. The performance was webcast on July 22, 2003 and released on November 22, 2003. A Pitchfork Media review calls it "unquestionably the brownest live Ween of them all."

All Request Live features tracks performed live as part of a web radio broadcast, playing songs selected by fans on the band's message board. Among the tracks performed are all three officially released parts of "The Stallion" (along with the previously unreleased part four, and part five, from Craters of the Sac), fan favorites "Awesome Sound" and "Demon Sweat", a slightly expanded version of the drug-addled skit "Pollo Asado", and a nearly six-minute-long take on the band's rejected Pizza Hut jingle, "Where'd the Cheese Go?"

Track listing
All tracks written by Ween.

References

2003 live albums
Ween live albums